The Curtiss P-37 was an American fighter aircraft made by Curtiss-Wright in 1937 for the US Army Air Corps.  A development of the Curtiss P-36 Hawk to use an inline engine instead of the radial engine of the P-36 the fuselage was lengthened and the cockpit moved back. A small number of YP-37 aircraft was built for Air Corps evaluation. The expected top speed was not achieved and the project  terminated in favor of the Curtiss P-40.

Design and development 
In early 1937, after realizing the P-36 Hawk was inferior to more modern European designs, the USAAC ordered Curtiss to adapt one P-36 to the new liquid-cooled turbo-supercharged Allison V-1710.  The prototype Hawk was fitted with a turbo-supercharged  Allison V-1710-11 as the XP-37 (company designation Model 75I).  The cockpit was moved back towards the tail to make room for the massive turbo-superchargers, and the engine was cooled by two radiators on either side of the nose. Armament was one  M1919 Browning machine gun and one  M2 Browning  heavy machine gun mounted in the nose.

Although the turbo-supercharger was extremely unreliable and visibility from the cockpit on takeoff and landing was virtually nonexistent, the USAAC was sufficiently intrigued by the promised performance to order 13 service test YP-37s and spares at a contract cost of $531,305.12 in 1938.  These aircraft were powered by an improved V-1710-21 with a more reliable supercharger mounted in a lengthened nose.  However, reliability problems and poor visibility continued to plague the YP-37, and the project was canceled in favor of a parallel development, the P-40 Warhawk.

Variants 

XP-37One aircraft built with a V-1710-11 engine.
YP-37 13 aircraft built with a V-1710-21 engines and extended fuselage

Specifications (YP-37)

See also

References

P-37
Curtiss P-37
Single-engined tractor aircraft
Low-wing aircraft
Aircraft first flown in 1937